Monocreagra is a genus of moths of the family Notodontidae. It consists of the following species:
Monocreagra orthyades Druce, 1893
Monocreagra pheloides C. and R. Felder, 1874
Monocreagra unimacula  (Warren, 1897)

References 

Notodontidae of South America